Qiyang is a county-level city of Hunan Province, China. It is under the administration of the prefecture-level city of Yongzhou.

Located on the south central part of the province, it is adjacent to the city proper of Yongzhou. The county is bordered to the north and the northeast by Qidong County, to the east by Changning City, to the south by Xintian and Ningyuan Counties, to the southwest and the west by Shuangpai County, Lingling and Lengshuitan Districts. It has a registered population of 1,061,000 and has a permanent resident population of 879,900. The county has 20 towns, 3 townships and 3 subdistricts under its jurisdiction, the county seat is Changhong Subdistrict.

Administrative divisions
3 subdistricts
 Changhong
 Longshan
 Wuxi

20 towns
 Babao
 Baishui
 Dacundian
 Dazhongqiao
 Gongjiaping
 Guanyinshan
 Huangnitang
 Jinbaotang
 Jindong
 Lijiaping
 Maozhu
 Meixi
 Panshi
 Qiliqiao
 Sankoutang
 Wenfu
 Wenmingpu
 Xiamadu
 Xiaojia
 Yangjiaotang

2 townships
 Fenghuang
 Shiguyuan

1 Yao ethnic township
 Shaibeitan

Climate

References

External links 

 
County-level divisions of Hunan
Yongzhou